Mohammed bin Saad al-Abdali (1946 – 7 February 2020) was a Saudi football player who played centre attack. His career spanned nearly 15 years, during which he scored  57 goals across 53 friendly matches and 130 goals across 132 official matches with al nasser. He was rated the second-best striker in the history of Al-Nassr Football club after Majed Abdullah, and the top scorer for the first Saudi league championship. He was born in Ta'if, Saudi Arabia.

Career With Al-Nassr

Al-Abdali's talent appeared as an accomplished striker. He found the opportunity to showcase his talent at the first team level despite his young age.

References

People from Taif
1946 births
2020 deaths
Al Nassr FC players
Saudi Professional League players
Association football forwards
Place of death missing
Saudi Arabian footballers